Agege is a suburb and local government area in the  Ikeja Division of Lagos State, Nigeria.

Etymology 
When the kolanut plantations in the Agege area started to flourish it attracted huge settlements. Agege experienced rapid development and became a powerful center of the kolanut trade. These settlements attracted different people of different backgrounds and interests such as laborers, and most of these were Hausa. Whenever the Yorubas needed labourers for jobs such as cutting of trees, they would engage the services of the Hausa people. Because of this work  the immediate area where the Hausas lived was named  ‘Ilu Awon Ageigi’ which translates as ‘Town (Ilu) of the tree cutters’. The name Agege was thus formed out of the word Ageigi.

Geography 
The boundary of Agege from the Northern part of Lagos stretches from Dopemu road through Anu-oluwapo street to olukosi down Fagbola through Osobu street to Orile road down to Old Agege Motor Road opposite Nitel. From the Southern part of Lagos it stretches from Ashade retail market to Akilo street.

From the Eastern part of Lagos it stretches from Oba ogunji road up to the by-pass to Agege Motor road by Nitel office. From the Western part of Lagos, the boundary of Agege stretches from Abeokuta express road from boundary with Ikeja Local government to Dopemu junction.

History 
The foundation of Agege as a populated and commercial settlement began when a railway station was located close to Orile -Agege, an Awori settlement; the new railway linked Lagos with Abeokuta and was subsequently extended to Ibadan and to the Northern region. Prior to the construction of the station, Awori and Egba farmers cultivated food and cash crops such as Cocoa and Kola nut within the settlement. It is worthy to note that large scale cocoa plantations in Yorubaland started at Agege, before extending to many South Western Nigerian towns. Commercial activities sprang up around the station as collection, sorting and grading of Cocoa for transportation and export took place at Agege. The kolanut trade between Agege and the Northern region also expanded as a railway service was extended to the Northern regions.  Small scale market activities also rose as market women set up shops close to the railway station.

The Agege Local Government was created in 1954 and was operative until 1967 after the first military takeover when it was merged with the Ikeja District council for a period of thirteen years. Agege was removed from the Ikeja Local Government in 1980 and remained so until 1983 when the Military took over power again and abolished the existing system of Local Government at the time . Again the Governance of Agege remained with Ikeja for another six (6) years. Subsequently, there have been three other local governments carved out from Agege Local Government. They are: Alimosho,  Ifako Ijaye and Orile-Agege Local Government Areas.

The Executive Chairman of Agege Local Government area of Lagos State is Alhaji Ganiyu Kola Egunjobi.

Economy
When Dasab Airlines existed, its Lagos office was in Agege.

People 
The inhabitants of Agege Local Government are multi-ethnic although the Awori are the indigenous inhabitants. Some major communities making up the Agege Local Government are Ogba, Asade, Dopemu, Orile, Magbon, Oko-Oba, Atobaje, Gbogunleri, Isale Oja, Oke-Koto, Panada, Tabon-Tabon, Ajegunle, Sango, Keke, Papa uku/Olusanya, Oniwaya, Moricas, Iloro, Mangoro, Darocha, Onipetesi, Alfa Nla and Agbotikuyo. The inhabitants of Agege Local Government are essentially Yorubas with the presence of sparse population of non-Yoruba speaking people.

Agege Bread 
The Agege bread is an unsliced bread. It is a bread in Agege. This unsliced bread became popular in Agege town a long time ago. The soft texture and long shelf life of this bread were loved and cherished by people. It had no name  nor label. People began to refer to it as Agege Bread as its popularity grew. Agege bread is now one of Lagosians' favourite foods , being sold everywhere from breakfast tables to garages almost in all the streets of Lagos.

Traditional Rulers 
In Agege / Orile Agege, the Chieftaincy Community has three recognized Obas and Six traditional members.

Events 
On 3 June 2012, Dana Air Flight 992 crashed into residential buildings in Agege while attempting to land at Murtala Muhammed International Airport, killing all 153 people on board and 10 other people on the ground.

Education 

It includes a campus of Lagos State University.

National Youth Service Corps Permanent Orientation Camp is located at Iyana-Ipaja Road, Agege.

Photo Gallery of Agege Community 

Railway stations in Nigeria

References

External links 

 Agege Local Government
 New School, NYC. Sustainable Cities Club blog post about Agege, Lagos

Slums in Nigeria
Neighborhoods of Lagos
Local Government Areas in Lagos State
Local Government Areas in Yorubaland